LO, The Danish Confederation of Trade Unions (Danish: LO, Landsorganisationen i Danmark or simply LO) was founded in 1898 and was an umbrella organisation (the largest of the three national trade union centers in Denmark) for 18 Danish trade unions.  At the end of 2018, it merged into the new Danish Trade Union Confederation.

History
Lizette Risgaard, who became the first ever female President for LO-Denmark in October 2015, had worked her way slowly up the ladder and was for eight years the vice president.

From 2015, LO engaged in negotiations with FTF about a potential merger.  This occurred on 1 January 2019, and the LO became part of the new Danish Trade Union Confederation.

Organisation
In 2016, LO had a membership of about 1.1 million workers (450,000 of them being public sector employees and 650,000 of them being private sector employees).  It cooperated with the two other Danish trade union centers: the AC – The Danish Confederation of Professional Associations and the FTF – Confederation of Professionals in Denmark.

Members of the 18 trade unions of the LO were typically skilled or unskilled manual labourers, tradesmen and blue-collar workers from the working class. Members may have had a vocational education, but not a college or academic degree. A typical LO-member occupied a lower class position in society and earned an hourly wage.

LO-members were e.g. blue-collar workers, cleaners, bus drivers, plumbers, electricians, nursing assistants, hairdressers, painters, cosmeticians, gardeners, iron workers, dairymen, secretaries, technicians, assistants, etc.

The LO was affiliated with the International Trade Union Confederation (ITUC), the European Trade Union Confederation (ETUC), the Trade Union Advisory Committee to the OECD (TUAC) and the Council of Nordic Trade Unions (NFS).

The LO carried the role of coordinating collective bargaining. It also sought to influence the government and the political parties when it comes to drafting and implementing legislation, especially in relation to labour market policies. It represented the trade union movement's interests on various boards, commissions and committees.

Affiliates

Presidents
1898: Jens Jensen
1903: Christian Martin Olsen
1909: Carl Madsen
1929: Vilhelm Nygaard
1937: Christian Jensen
1938: Knud V. Jensen
1939: Laurits Hansen
1943: Eiler Jensen
1967: Thomas Nielsen
1982: Knud Christensen
1987: Finn Thorgrimson
1996: Hans Jensen
2007: Harald Børsting
2015: Lizette Risgaard

References

External links
LO's Official Website (in Danish)
LO's Official Website (in English) 
Information published by LO (in English)

 
International Trade Union Confederation
European Trade Union Confederation
Trade Union Advisory Committee to the OECD
Council of Nordic Trade Unions
1898 establishments in Denmark
Trade unions established in 1890
2018 disestablishments in Denmark
Trade unions disestablished in 2018
Labour movement in Denmark